The Cushitic languages are a branch of the Afroasiatic language family. They are spoken primarily in the Horn of Africa, with minorities speaking Cushitic languages to the north in Egypt and the Sudan, and to the south in Kenya and Tanzania. As of 2012, the Cushitic languages with over one million speakers were Oromo, Somali, Beja, Afar, Hadiyya, Kambaata, Saho, and Sidama.

Official status
The Cushitic languages with the greatest number of total speakers are Oromo (37 million), Somali (22 million), Beja (3.2 million), Sidamo (3 million), and Afar (2 million).

Oromo serves as one of the official working languages of Ethiopia and is also the working language of several of the states within the Ethiopian federal system including Oromia, Harari and Dire Dawa regional states and of the Oromia Zone in the Amhara Region.

Somali is the first of two official languages of Somalia and three official languages of the self declared republic of Somaliland. It also serves as a language of instruction in Djibouti, and as the working language of the Somali Region in Ethiopia.

Beja, Afar, Blin and Saho, the languages of the Cushitic branch of Afroasiatic that are spoken in Eritrea, are languages of instruction in the Eritrean elementary school curriculum. The constitution of Eritrea also recognizes the equality of all natively spoken languages. Additionally, Afar is a language of instruction in Djibouti, as well as the working language of the Afar Region in Ethiopia.

Origin and prehistory
Christopher Ehret argues for a unified Proto-Cushitic language in the Red Sea Hills as far back as the Early Holocene. Based on onomastic evidence, the Medjay and the Blemmyes of northern Nubia are believed to have spoken Cushitic languages related to the modern Beja language. Less certain are hypotheses which propose that Cushitic languages were spoken by the people of the C-Group culture in northern Nubia, or the people of the Kerma culture in southern Nubia.

Typological characteristics

Phonology
Most Cushitic languages have a simple five-vowel system with phonemic length; a notable exception are the Agaw languages, which do not contrast vowel length, but have one or two additional central vowels. The consonant inventory of many Cushitic languages includes glottalic consonants, e.g. in Oromo, which has the ejectives  and the implosive . Less common are pharyngeal consonants , which appear e.g. in Somali or the Saho–Afar languages.

Pitch accent is found in most Cushitic languages, and plays a prominent role in morphology and syntax.

Grammar

Nouns
Nouns are inflected for case and number. All nouns are further grouped into two gender categories, masculine gender and feminine gender. In many languages, gender is overtly marked directly on the noun (e.g. in Awngi, where all female nouns carry the suffix -a).

The case system of many Cushitic languages is characterized by marked nominative alignment, which is typologically quite rare and predominantly found in languages of Africa. In marked nominative languages, the noun appears in unmarked "absolutive" case when cited in isolation, or when used as predicative noun and as object of a transitive verb; on the other hand, it is explicitly marked for nominative case when it functions as subject in a transitive or intransitive sentence.

Possession is usually expressed by genitive case marking of the possessor. South Cushitic—which has no case marking for subject and object—follows the opposite strategy: here, the possessed noun is marked for construct case, e.g. Iraqw afé-r mar'i "doors" (lit. "mouths of houses"), where afee "mouth" is marked for construct case.

Most nouns are by default unmarked for number, but can be explicitly marked for singular ("singulative") and plural number. E.g. in Bilin, dəmmu "cat(s)" is number-neutral, from which singular dəmmura "a single cat" and plural dəmmut "several cats" can be formed. Plural formation is very diverse, and employs ablaut (i.e. changes of root vowels or consonants), suffixes and reduplication.

Verbs
Verbs are inflected for person/number and tense/aspect. Many languages also have a special form of the verb in negative clauses.

Most languages distinguish seven person/number categories: first, second, third person, singular and plural number, with a masculine/feminine gender distinction in third person singular. The most common conjugation type employs suffixes. Some languages also have a prefix conjugation: in Beja and the Saho–Afar languages, the prefix conjugation is still a productive part of the verb paradigm, whereas in most other languages, e.g. Somali, it is restricted to only a few verbs. It is generally assumed that historically, the suffix conjugation developed from the older prefix conjugation, by combining the verb stem with a suffixed auxiliary verb. The following table gives an example for the suffix and prefix conjugations in affirmative present tense in Somali.

Syntax
Basic word order is verb final, the most common order being subject–object–verb (SOV). The subject or object can also follow the verb to indicate focus.

Classification

Overview
The phylum was first designated as Cushitic in 1858. The Omotic languages, once included in Cushitic, have almost universally been removed. The most influential recent classification, Tosco (2003), has informed later approaches. It and two more recent classifications are as follows:

Tosco (2000, East Cushitic revised 2020)
 North Cushitic (Beja)
 Central Cushitic (Agaw)
 South Cushitic
Maa (Bantu hybrid & partially a planned language, difficult to classify)
Dahalo (divergent; possibly not Southern Cushitic)
Rift
 East Cushitic
 Highland
 Lowland
 Saho–Afar
Southern
(nuclear Southern)
Omo–Tana
Oromoid
Peripheral (?)
Yaaku
Dullay

Appleyard (2012)
 North Cushitic (Beja)
 Central Cushitic (Agaw)
 South Cushitic
 East Cushitic
 Lowland East Cushitic
 Highland East Cushitic
 Yaaku–Dullay
 Dahalo

Bender (2019)
Geographic labels are given for comparison; Bender's labels are added in parentheses. Dahalo is made a primary branch, as also suggested by Kiessling and Mous (2003). Yaaku is not listed, being placed within Arboroid. Afar–Saho is removed from Lowland East Cushitic; since they are the most 'lowland' of the Cushitic languages, Bender calls the remnant 'core' East Cushitic.
 North Cushitic (Beja)
 Central Cushitic (Agew)
 Dahalo
 South Cushitic
 East Cushitic
 Afar–Saho
 Highland East Cushitic
 Lowland East Cushitic ('core' East Cushitic)
 Dullay
 SAOK
 Eastern Omo–Tana (Somaloid)
 Western Omo–Tana (Arboroid)
 Oromoid (Oromo–Konsoid)

These classifications have not been without contention. For example, it has been argued that Southern Cushitic belongs in the Eastern branch, with its divergence explained by contact with Hadza- and Sandawe-like languages. Hetzron (1980) and Fleming (post-1981) exclude Beja altogether, though this is rejected by other linguists. Some of the classifications that have been proposed over the years are summarized here:

For debate on the placement of the Cushitic branch within Afroasiatic, see Afroasiatic languages.

Beja

Beja constitutes the only member of the Northern Cushitic subgroup. As such, Beja contains a number of linguistic innovations that are unique to it, as is also the situation with the other subgroups of Cushitic (e.g. idiosyncratic features in Agaw or Central Cushitic). Hetzron (1980) argues that Beja therefore may comprise an independent branch of the Afroasiatic family. However, this suggestion has been rejected by most other scholars. The characteristics of Beja that differ from those of other Cushitic languages are instead generally acknowledged as normal branch variation.

Didier Morin (2001) assigned Beja to Lowland Cushitic on the grounds that the language shared lexical and phonological features with the Afar and Saho idioms, and also because the languages were historically spoken in adjacent speech areas. However, among linguists specializing in the Cushitic languages, the standard classification of Beja as North Cushitic is accepted.

Other divergent languages

There are also a few poorly-classified languages, including Yaaku, Dahalo, Aasax, Kw'adza, Boon, the Cushitic element of Mbugu (Ma'a) and Ongota. There is a wide range of opinions as to how the languages are interrelated.

The positions of the Dullay languages and of Yaaku are uncertain. They have traditionally been assigned to an East Cushitic subbranch along with Highland (Sidamic) and Lowland East Cushitic. However, Hayward thinks that East Cushitic may not be a valid node and that its constituents should be considered separately when attempting to work out the internal relationships of Cushitic.

The Afroasiatic identity of Ongota has also been broadly questioned, as is its position within Afroasiatic among those who accept it, because of the "mixed" appearance of the language and a paucity of research and data. Harold C. Fleming (2006) proposes that Ongota is a separate branch of Afroasiatic. Bonny Sands (2009) thinks the most convincing proposal is by Savà and Tosco (2003), namely that Ongota is an East Cushitic language with a Nilo-Saharan substratum. In other words, it would appear that the Ongota people once spoke a Nilo-Saharan language but then shifted to speaking a Cushitic language while retaining some characteristics of their earlier Nilo-Saharan language.

Hetzron (1980) and Ehret (1995) have suggested that the South Cushitic languages (Rift languages) are a part of Lowland East Cushitic, the only one of the six groups with much internal diversity.

Cushitic was formerly seen as also including the Omotic languages, then called West Cushitic. However, this view has been abandoned. Omotic is generally agreed to be an independent branch of Afroasiatic, primarily due to the work of Harold C. Fleming (1974) and Lionel Bender (1975); some linguists like Paul Newman (1980) challenge Omotic's classification within the Afroasiatic family itself.

Extinct languages
A number of extinct populations have been proposed to have spoken Afroasiatic languages of the Cushitic branch. Marianne Bechhaus-Gerst (2000) proposed that the peoples of the Kerma Culture – which inhabited the Nile Valley in present-day Sudan immediately before the arrival of the first Nubian speakers – spoke Cushitic languages. She argues that the Nilo-Saharan Nobiin language today contains a number of key pastoralism related loanwords that are of proto-Highland East Cushitic origin, including the terms for sheep/goatskin, hen/cock, livestock enclosure, butter and milk. However, more recent linguistic research indicates that the people of the Kerma culture (who were based in southern Nubia) instead spoke Nilo-Saharan languages of the Eastern Sudanic branch, and that the peoples of the C-Group culture to their north (in northern Nubia) and other groups in northern Nubia (such as the Medjay and Belmmyes) spoke Cushitic languages with the latter being related to the modern Beja language. The linguistic affinity of the ancient A-Group culture of northern Nubia—the predecessor of the C-Group culture—is unknown, but Rilly (2019) suggests that it is unlikely to have spoken a language of the Northern East Sudanic branch of Nilo-Saharan, and may have spoken a Cushitic language, another Afro-Asiatic language, or a language belonging to another (non-Northern East Sudanic) branch of the Nilo-Saharan family. Rilly also criticizes proposals (by Behrens and Bechaus-Gerst) of significant early Afro-Asiatic influence on Nobiin, and considers evidence of substratal influence on Nobiin from an earlier now extinct Eastern Sudanic language to be stronger.

Linguistic evidence indicates that Cushitic languages were spoken in Lower Nubia, an ancient region which straddles present day Southern Egypt and Northern Sudan, before the arrival of North Eastern Sudanic languages from Upper Nubia.

Julien Cooper (2017) states that in antiquity, Cushitic languages were spoken in Lower Nubia (the northernmost part of modern-day Sudan). He also states that Eastern Sudanic-speaking populations from southern and west Nubia gradually replaced the earlier Cushitic-speaking populations of this region.

In Handbook of Ancient Nubia, Claude Rilly (2019) states that Cushitic languages once dominated Lower Nubia along with the Ancient Egyptian language. He mentions historical records of the Blemmyes, a Cushitic-speaking tribe which controlled Lower Nubia and some cities in Upper Egypt. He mentions the linguistic relationship between the modern Beja language and the ancient Blemmyan language, and that the Blemmyes can be regarded as a particular tribe of the Medjay.

Additionally, historiolinguistics indicate that the makers of the Savanna Pastoral Neolithic (Stone Bowl Culture) in the Great Lakes area likely spoke South Cushitic languages.

Christopher Ehret (1998) proposed on the basis of loanwords that South Cushitic languages (called "Tale" and "Bisha" by Ehret) were spoken in an area closer to Lake Victoria than are found today.

Also, historically, the Southern Nilotic languages have undergone extensive contact with a "missing" branch of East Cushitic that Heine (1979) refers to as Baz.

Reconstruction 
Christopher Ehret proposed a reconstruction of Proto-Cushitic in 1987, but did not base this on individual branch reconstructions. Grover Hudson (1989) has done some preliminary work on Highland East Cushitic, David Appleyard (2006) has proposed a reconstruction of Proto-Agaw, and Roland Kießling and Maarten Mous (2003) have jointly proposed a reconstruction of West Rift Southern Cushitic. No reconstruction has been published for Lowland East Cushitic, though Paul D. Black wrote his (unpublished) dissertation on the topic in 1974. Hans-Jürgen Sasse (1979) proposed a reconstruction of the consonants of Proto-East Cushitic. No comparative work has yet brought these branch reconstructions together.

Comparative vocabulary

Basic vocabulary
Sample basic vocabulary of Cushitic languages from Vossen & Dimmendaal (2020:318) (with PSC denoting Proto-Southern Cushitic):

Numerals
Comparison of numerals in individual Cushitic languages:

See also
Cushitic speaking peoples
List of Proto-Cushitic reconstructions (Wiktionary)
Meroitic language

Notes

References

 Ethnologue on the Cushitic branch
 
 
 Bender, Marvin Lionel. 1975. Omotic: a new Afroasiatic language family. Southern Illinois University Museum series, number 3.
 Bender, M. Lionel. 1986. A possible Cushomotic isomorph. Afrikanistische Arbeitspapiere 6:149–155.
 
 
 
 Fleming, Harold C. 1974. Omotic as an Afroasiatic family. In: Proceedings of the 5th annual conference on African linguistics (ed. by William Leben), p 81-94. African Studies Center & Department of Linguistics, UCLA.
 
 
 Kießling, Roland & Maarten Mous. 2003. The Lexical Reconstruction of West-Rift Southern Cushitic. Cushitic Language Studies Volume 21
 
 Lamberti, Marcello. 1991. Cushitic and its classification. Anthropos 86(4/6):552-561.
 
 Newman, Paul. 1980. The Classification of Chadic within Afroasiatic. Universitaire Pers.
 
  
 
 
 Zaborski, Andrzej. 1986. Can Omotic be reclassified as West Cushitic? In Gideon Goldenberg, ed., Ethiopian Studies: Proceedings of the 6th International Conference, pp. 525–530. Rotterdam: Balkema.
 Reconstructing Proto-Afroasiatic (Proto-Afrasian): Vowels, Tone, Consonants, and Vocabulary (1995) Christopher Ehret

Further reading

External links
 Encyclopædia Britannica: Cushitic languages
 BIBLIOGRAPHY OF HIGHLAND EAST CUSHITIC
 Faculty of Humanities – Leiden University

 
Afroasiatic languages